An Lochan Uaine is a small freshwater loch in the Highland council area of Scotland.

Etymology 

Lochan Uaine can be translated from Scottish gaelic as Green Tarn. According to local legends, the green color of its water is caused by the fairies who wash their green clothes in the lake.

Geography
The lake is located at an elevation of  about  NE of Loch Morlich. It lies at the foot of the Eastern flanks of the Greag Nan Gall (622 m). The lake is considered by geologists a good example of a morainic tarn.

Nature conservation 

The loch is included in the Glenmore Forest Park, not faraway from its visitor centre, and in the Cairngorms National Park.

Hiking 

The lake can be reached from Loch Morlich with an easy walk, starting from the Glenmore Forest visitor centre; walking a little more is possible to touch the Ryvoan Pass too, at the end of the glen. The hike is considered very suitable also for children.

References

Lochs of Highland (council area)
Freshwater lochs of Scotland